Engel-Yurt (Engal-Yurt) is a rural locality (a selo) in Gudermessky District, Chechnya.

Administrative and municipal status 
Municipally, Engel-Yurt is incorporated as Engel-Yurtovskoye rural settlement. It is the administrative center of the municipality and is the only settlement included in it.

Geography 

Engel-Yurt is located on the left bank of the Aksai River, not far from the border with Dagestan.

The nearest settlements to Engel-Yurt are Khangish-Yurt and Azamat-Yurt in the north-west, Karasuv-Otar in the north, Aksai in the north-east, Razak-Otar in the east, Gerzel-Aul in the south-east, and Kadi-Yurt and Biltoy-Yurt in the south-west.

History 
Engel-Yurt was founded in 1770.

In 1944, after the genocide and deportation of the Chechen and Ingush people and the Chechen-Ingush ASSR was abolished, the village of Engel-Yurt was renamed, and was settled by people from the neighbouring republic of Dagestan. From 1944 to 1957, it was a part of the Dagestan ASSR. 

In 1957, when the Vaynakh people returned and the Chechen-Ingush ASSR was restored, the village regained its old name, Engel-Yurt.

Population 
 1990 Census: 4,011
 2002 Census: 5,496
 2010 Census: 4,458
 2020 estimate: 5,856

According to the results of the 2010 Census, the majority of residents of Engel-Yurt were ethnic Chechens.

Teips 
Residents of Engel-Yurt come from the following teips:
 Aitkhalloy
 Engenoy
 Kurchaloy
 Biltoy
 Zandakoy
 Shonoy

Education 
Engel-Yurt hosts two secondary schools.

References 

Rural localities in Gudermessky District